Greatest Hits is a collection of ten previously released singles by Ray Stevens, released in 1983 by RCA Records. This collection contains three singles that were released by Monument Records, four by Barnaby Records, and two by RCA. One of the selections is not an original recording; "Ahab the Arab" is a re-recording of Stevens' 1962 hit for Mercury Records that was included on his album Gitarzan, which was released by Monument in 1969. Additionally, there are two selections featured on this collection that are album versions; "Gitarzan" is the album version that begins with cheering and applauding with an audience; "Freddie Feelgood" is the version that contains audience noises and was first featured on the album Gitarzan.

Track listing

In the cassette version of this album, "The Dooright Family" and "Shriner's Convention" have their track positions switched.

Album credits
Arranged and Produced by: Ray Stevens
"Ahab the Arab," "The Streak," "Everything Is Beautiful," "Mr. Businessman," "The Moonlight Special," "Misty," "Gitarzan," "Freddie Feelgood (And His Funky Little Five Piece Band)," under license from Barnaby Records, Inc.
Remastering Engineer: Bill Vandevort, Music City Music Hall, Nashville, TN
Disc Mastering Engineer: Randy Kling, Disc Mastering, Inc. (Randy's Roost), Nashville, TN
Art Direction: Herb Burnette, Pinwheel Studios, Nashville, TN
Photography: Graham Henman

Chart performance

References

1983 compilation albums
Ray Stevens compilation albums
RCA Records compilation albums